Two Dogs (French: Deux Chiens) is an oil-on-canvas painting by the French artist Pierre Bonnard, created in 1891. It is held at the Southampton City Art Gallery in Southampton.

History and description
In 1891, Bonnard entered a competition to design dining room furniture. Although his project never materialized, Bonnard used an already existing cabinet door design for his painting Two Dogs. The painting depicts two brown poodles playing, one up and other down, both barking, in a green floor, while two flowers can be seen at the right. The poodles may have been modeled on Bonnard's own dog, Ravageau. The simple but expressive composition, as well as the use of several "color blocks" shows the artist's interest in Japanese prints. In this work, along with the painting Study for a Cat (1890), Bonnard tries to use the influence of the Japanese masters and revive pure decorativeness with life impressions. At the same time, dark dogs are often a repetitive and important theme for the artist.

Provenance
In 1963, the painting was given to the Southampton City Art Gallery by the will of the gallery owner and collector Arthur Tilden Jeffress.

References

1891 paintings
Paintings by Pierre Bonnard
Dogs in art